Wood End is a railway station on the North Warwickshire Line serving the village of Wood End in Warwickshire, England.

Situated on the Stratford-upon-Avon to Birmingham route, the station was opened by the Great Western Railway in 1908 along with the line, and was originally known as Wood End Platform, the suffix was later dropped. The station is located in a deep cutting.

In 2014, the footbridge over the line was removed and new stairs were installed leading to both platforms from the main road.

Services
It is a request stop: passengers wishing to board a train here must signal to the driver; those wishing to alight must inform the train conductor.

There is no Sunday service.

References

External links

Historical photographs at www.warwickshirerailways.com
Rail Around Birmingham and the West Midlands: Wood End station

Railway stations in Warwickshire
DfT Category F2 stations
Former Great Western Railway stations
Railway stations in Great Britain opened in 1908
Railway stations served by West Midlands Trains
Railway request stops in Great Britain
1908 establishments in England
Tanworth-in-Arden